Marcial is both a given name and a surname. Notable people with the name include:

People with the given name
Marcial Ávalos, Paraguayan footballer
Marcial Calleja (1863–1914), Filipino lawyer
Marcial Cuquerella (born 1977), Spanish businessman
Marcial Gómez Parejo (1930–2012), Spanish painter and illustrator
Marcial Hernandez (born 1974), Dutch military officer and politician
Marcial Lichauco (1902–1971), Filipino lawyer and diplomat
Marcial Maciel (1920–2008), Mexican Catholic priest and sex offender
Marcial Mes (c. 1949 – 2014), Belizean politician
Marcial Pina (born 1946), Spanish footballer
Marcial Samaniego, Paraguayan general, writer and politician

People with the surname
 Ana Marcial (born 1953), Puerto Rican swimmer
 Eumir Felix Marcial (born 1995), Filipino boxer

See also
 Martial (disambiguation)

Spanish masculine given names